Tashla is a rural locality (a selo) and the administrative center of Tashlinsky District, Orenburg Oblast, Russia. There has been three population censuses for Tashla. The first was in 1989 with a population of   The second in 2002 with a population of   And the third in 2010 with a population of

References

Notes

Sources

Rural localities in Orenburg Oblast